Dave Morrison is a retired American soccer goalkeeper who played professionally in the North American Soccer League.

Born in Seattle, Morrison grew up in Livermore and Fountain Valley, California.  He attended Cal State Fullerton where he played on the men's soccer team from 1975 to 1978.  He then played from 1979 to at least 1981 with the Los Angeles Aztecs of the North American Soccer League.

References

External links
 NASL stats

1957 births
Living people
American soccer players
Association football goalkeepers
Cal State Fullerton Titans men's soccer players
Los Angeles Aztecs players
North American Soccer League (1968–1984) indoor players
North American Soccer League (1968–1984) players
Soccer players from Seattle
People from Livermore, California